Eric Kripke (born 1974) is an American writer and television producer. He came to prominence as the creator of the fantasy drama series Supernatural (2005–2020) which aired on The CW. He served as the showrunner during the first five seasons of the series. Kripke also created the post-apocalyptic drama series Revolution (2012–2014) and co-created the science fiction series Timeless (2016–2018). Since 2019, he has served as showrunner of the superhero series The Boys, which was developed for Amazon Prime Video.

Early life
Kripke, who is Jewish, was raised in the Toledo, Ohio, suburb Sylvania Township, the son of Larry and Joan Kripke, and graduated from  Sylvania Southview High School in 1992. Kripke often created home movies with friends to show to other students. His artistic influences include John Bellairs. He attended the University of Southern California.

Career
Kripke's 16-minute short film Truly Committed received an audience choice award at the Slamdance Film Festival. He also directed the short Battle of the Sexes. He later developed and wrote for The WB's 2003 television series Tarzan, which was cancelled after eight episodes, and followed this by writing the 2005 film Boogeyman. Furthermore, he was an associate producer for the 2011 romantic action thriller The Adjustment Bureau.

He was developing his first feature film Haunted, for a 2012 release. In August 2011, it was announced that Kripke was developing a series for The CW Television Network based on the DC Comics character Deadman, but no series materialized.

Boogeyman

Prior to his success with Supernatural, Kripke co-wrote the screenplay for the film Boogeyman, which was released in early 2005. The film focuses on Tim, played by Barry Watson, who is suffering the loss of his mother; he goes home to confront the supernatural creature who he believes killed his father and is also the reason for his mother's demise.

Supernatural

In 2005, Kripke created the series Supernatural, which is about two brothers' (Sam and Dean Winchester) personal battle against demons, poltergeists and other supernatural phenomena. Kripke served as a part-time executive consultant on season seven on the series after serving as the show's primary showrunner for the first five seasons. Supernatural first aired on The WB and then on The CW, which was created by The WB's 2006 merger with UPN. During the series, it was in 2008 that he signed an overall deal with Warner Bros.

Revolution

After Kripke stepped down as primary showrunner for Supernatural following the show's fifth season, he began developing other projects. One of these projects, entitled Revolution, was picked by NBC for the 2012–13 season. The series centers on a group of characters struggling to survive and reunite with loved ones in a post-apocalyptic world where everything electronic has mysteriously stopped working, and centers around their battle to resolve the blackout. It stars Billy Burke, Tracy Spiridakos, David Lyons, Giancarlo Esposito, Elizabeth Mitchell, Graham Rogers and Anna Lise Phillips co-starring.

Revolution has a Metacritic rating of 64/100 from 32 reviews. Glenn Garvin of The New York Times wrote, "Revolution is big, bold and brassy adventure, a cowboys-and-Indians story for end times."

Revolution was cancelled by NBC after two seasons.

Jacked
In April 2015, Kripke announced he is writing the comic book series called  Amped (later re-titled Jacked) for Vertigo and DC Comics to be released in fall 2015. The story follows Josh Jaffe, a neurotic family man who buys an online 'smart pill' to increase his focus and jolt him out of his slump, but to his surprise finds the pill gives him super strength, prompting him to try to become a superhero. Concurrently, a TV adaptation was being developed for USA Network, with Kripke serving as both the writer and executive producer. The series was set to be co-produced by Kripke Enterprises and Warner Horizon Television.

Timeless

In August 2015, it was announced that Kripke, along with fellow writer Shawn Ryan, were developing an action-adventure show, Timeless, for NBC. Described as "Back to the Future meets Mission: Impossible", Timeless is about an unlikely trio traveling through time to battle unknown criminals in order to protect history. Ryan and Kripke co-wrote the script and executive-produced with Davis Entertainment's John Davis, John Fox and MiddKid Productions.

After being cancelled after one season, a fan campaign was made to revive the series for a short second season which was again subsequently cancelled when ratings did not improve.

The Boys

On April 6, 2016, it was announced that Cinemax was developing a television series adaption of the comic book. The production was being developed by Kripke, Evan Goldberg and Seth Rogen. Kripke was set to write the series while Goldberg and Rogen were set to direct, with Kripke, Goldberg, Rogen, Neal H. Moritz, Pavun Shetty, Ori Marmur, James Weaver, Ken Levin and Jason Netter serving as executive producers. Garth Ennis and Darick Robertson were set as co-executive producers. Production companies involved with the series included Point Grey Television, Original Film and Sony Pictures Television.

Filmography

Film

Television
The numbers in directing and writing credits refer to the number of episodes.

References

External links
 
  Archived from the original on March 10, 2016.

Jewish American writers
American male writers
American television directors
Television producers from Ohio
1974 births
Living people
Writers from Toledo, Ohio
Showrunners
American television writers
American male television writers
USC School of Cinematic Arts alumni
American male screenwriters
Screenwriters from Ohio
21st-century American Jews